505th may refer to:

505th Bombardment Group, inactive United States Air Force unit
505th Bombardment Squadron, part of the 319th Air Refueling Wing at Grand Forks Air Force Base, North Dakota
505th Brigade, Brigade of the Army of the Republic of Bosnia and Herzegovina
505th Command and Control Wing, organized under the USAF Warfare Center
505th Fighter Squadron or 138th Fighter Squadron, squadron of the United States Air Force
505th Infantry Regiment (United States) (505th PIR), one of four infantry regiments of the 82nd Airborne Division of the United States Army

See also
505 (number)
505, the year 505 (DV) of the Julian calendar
505 BC